Ma, also known as A-Ma-Lo, Amadi, Madi, Madyo, is a Ubangian language spoken in Haut-Uele Province, the Democratic Republic of Congo.

References

Mba languages
Languages of the Democratic Republic of the Congo